The Aermacchi AM.3 was the result of a joint venture between Aermacchi and Aeritalia (then Aerfer Industrie Aerospaziali Meridionali) in response to an Italian Army requirement for an aircraft to replace the Cessna L-19, and was initially designated the MB-335.

Design and development

The AM.3 used the wing design of the Aermacchi AL-60 utility aircraft, strengthened to incorporate two hardpoints. The fuselage was a new design.
 
The first prototype, constructed by Aermacchi, flew on 12 May 1967, and it was displayed at the Paris air show in June that year.  The second prototype, constructed by AERFER, flew on 22 August 1968, but the aircraft lost the Italian Army contract to the SIAI Marchetti SM.1019. Nevertheless, Aeritalia continued development.

The third prototype used a more powerful Piaggio-built Lycoming GSO-480-B1B6 in place of the original Continental GTSIO-520-C, and this variant was designated AM.3C

Pilot and observer are accommodated in tandem positions, and the craft features dual controls. Aft space is utilitarian, providing space for two stretchers or seat space for additional passengers. Additional configurations include freight transport.

Armament configurations are diverse, as well. Two standard underwing pylons were able to carry 170 kg (375 lb) of stores each. Typical armament includes machine guns, rockets, bombs and missiles. Reconnaissance packs could be fitted to, or inside of, the fuselage. Additional pylons were often added by customers.

Bosbok

In September 1970, the South African Air Force ordered 40 AM.3Cs, designating the aircraft the AM.3CM Bosbok (Bush-buck). The first aircraft was taken on charge in March 1973, with deliveries continuing until December 1975, equipping 41 Squadron and 42 Squadron.

The Bosbok saw extensive action during the South African military operations in Angola between 1975 and 1989, during which it wore an olive-drab/dark earth camouflage instead of the light-grey paint scheme in which it was delivered.

The SAAF's Bosboks had four underwing hardpoints from which a variety of ordnance could be hung, including machine-gun pods, light bombs, and smoke-rocket pods. Each of the two inner hardpoints was stressed for a 170 kg (375 lb) load, with the two outer points being stressed for a 91 kg (200 lb) load.

Roles performed by the Bosbok in SAAF service include:
 Forward air control
 Radio relay (referred to as "Telstar duty" by the SAAF)
 Target marking (using smoke-rockets)
 Reconnaissance/observation (including artillery spotting)
 Casevac
 Liaison

The Bosbok really excelled in the dangerous role of target-marking, in which it used this technique - the aircraft would approach the target at tree-top height, pull up to around 92 m (300 ft) when nearly overhead the target, line up the nose on the target, and release the rockets, before quickly turning away and diving back to tree-top level to avoid ground fire.

Using this method, a Bosbok was once credited with destroying an entire 37 mm anti-aircraft gun position with a lucky direct hit from one of its smoke marker rockets.

Following the end of South Africa's involvement in the Angolan War in 1989 and the subsequent downsizing of the SAAF, the Bosbok was retired from service in 1992.

Operators

 Italian Army (20)

 Rwandan Air Force (3)

South African Air Force (40)
41 Squadron SAAF
42 Squadron SAAF

National Test Pilot School (1)

Specifications (AM-3C)

References

Further reading

External links

 Specs & Photo at Flugzeuginfo.net
 Bosbok Survivors List with Pictures

1960s Italian military utility aircraft
AM.3
Single-engined tractor aircraft
Aircraft first flown in 1967
High-wing aircraft